The Forest is a tram stop on Nottingham Express Transit (NET) in the city of Nottingham. It takes its name from the nearby Forest Recreation Ground, the site of the city's famous annual Goose Fair. The Forest serves as one of several park and ride stops on the NET network, with more than 950 car parking spaces located next to the stop.

The stop is situated on reserved track, between the street and recreation ground, and has three tracks. The western two tracks flank an island platform, whilst the easternmost track is served by its own side platform. In normal service, the westernmost track is used by northbound trams, and the easternmost by southbound trams towards the city. The centre track is connected to both running lines in both directions, and can be used to turn back short workings.

To the north of the stop, the two running tracks cross each other and run separately in two different street alignments, using Gauntlet track. Trams heading north next call at the Noel Street stop, whilst trams coming south do so via the Hyson Green Market stop.

The tram stop opened on 9 March 2004, along with the rest of NET's initial system.

With the opening of NET's phase two, The Forest is now on the common section of the NET, where line 1, between Hucknall and Chilwell, and line 2, between Phoenix Park and Clifton, operate together. Trams on each line run at frequencies that vary between 4 and 8 trams per hour, depending on the day and time of day, combining to provide up to 16 trams per hour on the common section.

Gallery

References

External links

Nottingham Express Transit stops
Railway stations in Great Britain opened in 2004